The Last  may refer to:

The Last (band), Los Angeles power pop band active since 1976
The Last (audio drama), a Doctor Who audio drama released in 2004
The Last (album), 2009 album by Aventura
"The Last", a song by The Replacements from the 1990 album All Shook Down
The Last: Naruto the Movie, 2014 Japanese animated film from the Naruto franchise
The Last (film), 2019 movie

See also
Last (disambiguation)
The Last One (disambiguation)
The Last Man (disambiguation)